Psocomorpha is a suborder of barklice, booklice, and parasitic lice in the order Psocodea (formerly Psocoptera). There are more than 20 families and 5,300 described species in Psocomorpha.

Phylogeny
The below cladogram of Psocodea shows the position of Psocomorpha:

Fossil record
The oldest fossil record of the suborder is Burmesopsocus lienhardi from the mid-Cretaceous (early Cenomanian) Burmese amber, which is not assigned to any family.

Classification
Psocomorpha contains 6 infraorders and 26 families:

Archipsocetae
 Archipsocidae Pearman, 1936 (ancient barklice)
Caeciliusetae
 Amphipsocidae Pearman, 1936 (hairy-winged barklice)
 Asiopsocidae Mockford & Garcia Aldrete, 1976
 Caeciliusidae Mockford, 2000 (lizard barklice)
 Dasydemellidae Mockford, 1978 (shaggy psocids)
 Paracaeciliidae Mockford, 1989
 Stenopsocidae Pearman, 1936 (narrow barklice)
Epipsocetae
 Cladiopsocidae Smithers, 1972
 Dolabellopsocidae Eertmoed, 1973
 Epipsocidae Pearman, 1936 (elliptical barklice)
 Ptiloneuridae Roesler, 1940
 Spurostigmatidae Eertmoed, 1973
Homilopsocidea
 Ectopsocidae Roesler, 1944 (outer barklice)
 Elipsocidae Pearman, 1936 (damp barklice)
 Lachesillidae Pearman, 1936 (fateful barklice)
 Lesneiidae Schmidt & New, 2004
 Mesopsocidae Pearman, 1936 (middle barklice)
 Peripsocidae Roesler, 1944 (stout barklice)
 Sabulopsocidae Schmidt & New, 2004
Philotarsetae
 Philotarsidae Pearman, 1936 (loving barklice)
 Pseudocaeciliidae Pearman, 1936 (false lizard barklice)
 Trichopsocidae Pearman, 1936 (lash-faced psocids)
Psocetae
 Hemipsocidae Pearman, 1936 (leaf litter barklice)
 Myopsocidae Pearman, 1936 (mouse-like barklice)
 Psilopsocidae Roesler, 1944
 Psocidae Hagen, 1865 (common barklice)

References

Further reading

External links

 

 
Insect suborders
Psocodea